Cursores is the plural of the Latin Cursor, 'runner'. There have been various corps of auxiliary officers in various institutions by that name.

At universities, the term has been used for the candidates for the license.

Cursores apostolici

This was the Latin title of the ecclesiastical heralds or pursuivants pertaining to the papal court. 

Their origin is placed in the twelfth century, and they fulfilled for the pontifical government the duties entrusted to heralds by civil states. From the sixteenth century onward they formed part of the Roman Curia in its broader sense, and are reckoned members of the pontifical family. They carried a club-shaped beaten silver mace (mazza), like the mazzieri and the Swiss guard vergers. Their number has been fixed at nineteen, and they are subject to the major-domo.
 
The principal duties of the cursores are to invite those who are to take part in consistories and functions in the papal chapel; to act as servitors in the pontifical palace and as doorkeepers of the conclave; to affix papal rescripts to the doors of the greater Roman basilicas; to issue the summons for attendance at canonizations, the funerals of cardinals etc. As representatives of the pope, the cursores must be received with the respect becoming the personage in whose name they speak, and their invitation has the force of a judicial summons.
 
In the early ages of the Church, an institution somewhat similar to that of the cursores is found in messengers, chosen from among the clergy, to carry important tidings from one bishop to another or from the bishop to his flock. They were much used in times of persecution and they are frequently referred to in the writings of the Fathers as praecones, internuntii etc. As guardians of the assemblies of the faithful, they were called vigiliae 'watchmen'. Despite these resemblances to the modern cursores, it seems evident that the latter took their rise from the employment of heralds by civil states, rather than from the praecones of the early Church. Episcopal courts have likewise cursores or apparitors among their officials.

Role in promulgation of canon law
In Rome the custom, which became exclusive during the fifteenth century, developed of having the new canonic laws read and posted up by cursores at Rome only, at the doors of the basilica majors, the Palazzo Cancellaria, the Campo de’ fiori and sometimes at the Capitol, as a means of promulgation.

Sources and references
  & elsewhere

Officials of the Roman Curia
Canon law history
History of the Roman Curia
Papal household